Rachid El Hammouchi (born 12 September 1981) is a Moroccan-German former professional footballer who played as a defensive midfielder or right-back. He played in the 3. Liga for Kickers Emden.

References

External links
 

1981 births
Living people
Sportspeople from Mülheim
German people of Moroccan descent
Moroccan footballers
Footballers from North Rhine-Westphalia
Association football midfielders
Association football fullbacks
3. Liga players
Eerste Divisie players
SpVgg Greuther Fürth II players
Fortuna Sittard players
Kickers Emden players
SV Wilhelmshaven players
Wuppertaler SV players
Wormatia Worms players